Dedunu Gunaratne is a Sri Lankan former cricketer who played as a right-handed batter. She appeared in one Test match and two One Day Internationals for Sri Lanka in 1998.

She played all three matches against Pakistan, on their tour in 1998. She scored 55 runs in her two innings in Test cricket, and 72 in her two ODIs. She made her ODI debut in the second match of the one-day series against Pakistan, opening the batting. Her score of 57* helped Sri Lanka to a 4 wicket victory.

References

External links
 
 

Living people
Date of birth missing (living people)
Year of birth missing (living people)
Place of birth missing (living people)
Sri Lankan women cricketers
Sri Lanka women Test cricketers
Sri Lanka women One Day International cricketers